Callison is a surname. Notable people with this name include:
Brian Callison (born 1934), British novelist
Candis Callison, Canadian journalist
Cassie Callison, fictional character on US soap opera One Life to Live
Johnny Callison (1939–2006), American baseball player
Preston Callison (1923–2022), American attorney and politician
Prink Callison (1899–1986), American football player
Zach Callison (born 1997), American actor, voice actor and singer